Lake Plantagenet is a lake in the U.S. state of Minnesota.

The name of the lake commemorates the House of Plantagenet. Its name in the Ojibwe language is Ozaawindibe-zaaga'igan (Yellow-head Lake), named after Ozaawindib, an Ojibwe who guided Henry Schoolcraft to the nearby Omashkoozo-zaaga'igan (Elk Lake), renamed by Schoolcraft Lake Itasca.

See also
List of lakes in Minnesota

References

Lakes of Minnesota
Lakes of Beltrami County, Minnesota
Lakes of Hubbard County, Minnesota